Gillarong (also spelt Gilaroong) is a small Aboriginal community, located adjacent to the Bayulu Community approximately  south east of Fitzroy Crossing in the Kimberley region of Western Australia, within the Shire of Derby-West Kimberley.

Native title 

The community is located within the registered area of the Gooniyandi Combined #2 (WAD6008/2000) native title claim.

Governance 

The community is managed through its incorporated body, Gilaroong Aboriginal Corporation, incorporated under the Aboriginal Councils and Associations Act 1976 on 28 February 1989.

Town planning 

Gillarong does not have its own Layout Plan, but comes under the Bayulu Layout Plan No.1, which includes Gillarong and Karnparni. This has been prepared in accordance with State Planning Policy 3.2 Aboriginal Settlements, and was endorsed by the Gillarong community on 19 May 2011 and by the Western Australian Planning Commission on 9 October 2012.

References

External links 
 Planning Western Australia's official site – Bayulu Layout Plan, https://www.dplh.wa.gov.au/information-and-services/state-planning/aboriginal-communities/aboriginal-community-maps/layout-plans

Towns in Western Australia
Aboriginal communities in Kimberley (Western Australia)